Villa Ocampo is a town and seat of the municipality of Ocampo, in the state of Durango, north-western Mexico.  As of 2010, the town had a population of 1,076.

References

Populated places in Durango